Andrés Antonio Montes González (1955–2009) was a Spanish sportswriter, journalist and commentator.

Biography 
He was born in Madrid on 27 November 1955 to Antonio Montes Seoane, a Galician merchant from Vigo (father) and Cuban pianist Zenaida Manfugas (mother), but he was primarily raised by Lorenza, a Segovian nurse. He began his career in 1980 mainly in basketball and football broadcasting, working for Cadena COPE and various public and private radio stations. In 1996, he began commentating on NBA matches on Spanish television for Canal +.

He was known for his uninhibited and flashy style, as well as his use of slang and linguistic fillers, which was the influence of him coining the popular football phrase Tiki-taka.

Montes was found dead in his home on the night of 16 October 2009, with the cause of death being heart attack.

References

External links

1955 births
2009 deaths
Spanish agnostics
Spanish reporters and correspondents
Spanish sports journalists
Basketball announcers
Association football commentators
Spanish people of Cuban descent